Rubén Lobato Cabal (born 9 March 1994) is a Spanish professional footballer. Mainly a left-back, he can also play as a left winger.

Club career
Lobato was born in Madrid, and was a Rayo Vallecano youth graduate. On 5 August 2013 he signed for Tercera División side RSD Alcalá, and made his senior debut on 25 August in a 1–0 away win against CD San Fernando.

In 2014 Lobato joined Atlético Madrid and was assigned to the C-team also in the fourth division. The following 22 January he was loaned to fellow league team Pontevedra CF, and on 31 July 2015 he moved to Segunda División B side CD Lealtad in a permanent deal.

On 1 July 2016, Lobato agreed to a contract with CF Fuenlabrada in the third division. On 16 January of the following year, he moved to fellow league team Mérida AD.

In 2017, Lobato moved to Real Oviedo and was assigned to the reserves. On 3 July 2019, after two seasons as a starter, he moved straight to La Liga side SD Eibar on a three-year contract, but left the club just one-and-a-half-month later and subsequently signed for third division side Getafe CF B.

On 3 January 2020, Lobato signed for Burgos CF also in the third division. He helped the side to achieve promotion to Segunda División in the 2020–21 season, before terminating his contract on 15 July 2021.

On 1 February 2022, after six months of inactivity, Lobato moved abroad and agreed to a contract with Polish Ekstraklasa side GKS Górnik Łęczna. He made his professional debut on 9 May, replacing Daniel Dziwniel in a 1–1 home draw against Bruk-Bet Termalica Nieciecza. On 1 December 2022, he terminated his contract with the club by mutual consent.

References

External links
 
 
 

1994 births
Living people
Footballers from Madrid
Spanish footballers
Association football defenders
Segunda División B players
Tercera División players
Ekstraklasa players
I liga players
RSD Alcalá players
Atlético Madrid C players
Pontevedra CF footballers
CD Lealtad players
CF Fuenlabrada footballers
Mérida AD players
Real Oviedo Vetusta players
SD Eibar footballers
Getafe CF B players
Burgos CF footballers
Górnik Łęczna players
Spanish expatriate footballers
Spanish expatriate sportspeople in Poland
Expatriate footballers in Poland